Andalusian Liberation (in Spanish: Liberación Andaluza; LA) was an Andalusian nationalist and independentist political party in Andalusia. In the 1986 Andalusian elections LA got 5,996 votes (0.18%). The platform was dissolved in 1989, at least as a "political movement", because of its limited success.

Ideology
LA mixed the ideas of Blas Infante with Islamic Neo-andalusism, represented by the Yama'a Islámica de Al-Andalus. LA proposed an official status for the Arabic language in the region. LA was openly independentist. LA thought that Islam was not a religion itself but the expression of the Andalusian cultural "genius and style".

LA was irredentist, advocating an expanded Andalusia comprising the current autonomous regions of Andalusia and Murcia, the Extremaduran province of Badajoz, the Sierra de Álcaraz in Castilla-La Mancha, the Portuguese Algarve and Gibraltar. LA was against the Capitulations of Granada and an alleged process of colonization of Andalusia by Spain.

External links
 Website in memory of LA

References

1985 establishments in Spain
1989 disestablishments in Spain
Andalusian nationalist parties
Arab nationalist political parties
Arabs in Spain
Defunct nationalist parties in Spain
Islamic political parties
Islamism in Spain
Pan-Arabist political parties
Political parties disestablished in 1989
Political parties established in 1985
Political parties in Andalusia
Pro-independence parties